Jonathan Marshall may refer to:

Jonathan Marshall (publisher) (1924–2008), American newspaper publisher, philanthropist, political candidate
Jonathan Marshall (American football), American football defensive tackle

See also
John Marshall (disambiguation)